The Dana Foundation (Charles A. Dana Foundation) is a private philanthropic organization based in New York dedicated to advancing neuroscience and society by supporting cross-disciplinary intersections such as neuroscience and ethics, law, policy, humanities, and arts.

Leadership 
The foundation was founded in 1950 by Charles A. Dana, a legislator and businessman from New York State, and president of the Dana Corporation. He presided over the organization until 1960, but continued to participate until his death in 1975.

Steven E. Hyman, M.D., is chairman of the board of directors of the foundation. Caroline Montojo, Ph.D., is the current president of the foundation.

The Dana Alliance for Brain Initiatives 
The Dana Foundation supported the Dana Alliance for Brain Initiatives (which included the European Dana Alliance for the Brain), a nonprofit organization of leading neuroscientists committed to advancing public awareness about the progress and promise of brain research, from 1993 to 2022. 

As William Safire put it in his column retiring from The New York Times in 2005: "They [the foundation] roped me in, a dozen years ago, to help enliven a moribund 'decade of the brain.' By encouraging many of the most prestigious neuroscientists to get out of the ivory tower and explain in plain words the potential of brain science, they enlisted the growing public and private support for research."

Grant programs 
In 2022, the Dana Foundation pivoted away from grants for research to grants that aim to strengthen neuroscience's positive role in the world. Current grants fall under three categories.

NextGen: To develop a new generation of interdisciplinary experts who shepherd neuroscience uses for a better world.
Its current major project is creating Dana Centers for Neuroscience & Society.   

Frontiers: To grow capacity for informed public reflection on emerging neuroscience and neurotechnology. Its projects include Judicial Seminars on Emerging Issues in Neuroscience, which provide state and federal judges in the US with a better understanding of the role neuroscience may play in making legal determinations in the courts, from the admissibility of neuroimaging evidence to decisions about criminal culpability. The foundation also provides funding for the Royal Society's Neuroscience and the Law program in the UK.

Education: To spark interest and support education around neuroscience and the many ways it interfaces with our everyday lives. Its projects include the annual Brain Awareness Week, next held March 13-19, 2023.

Past research grant programs 
The Dana Foundation's area of research emphasis had been in neuroscience, focusing on neuroimaging and clinical neuroscience research. In 2019, the foundation paused awarding new research grants while the board of trustees worked to revise its strategic plan for future neuroscience grants. 

Also supported were studies to develop ethical guidelines in brain research and explore other aspects of neuroethics.

Public education 
The foundation has a range of outreach initiatives for the general public and for targeted audiences. Major initiatives include:

Event-based programs 
Brain Awareness Week (#brainweek) is the global campaign to increase public awareness of the progress and benefits of brain research. Partner organizations host creative and innovative activities in their communities to educate kids and adults about the brain. Brain Awareness Week 2023 is March 13 to 19; BrainWeek 2024 will be March 11 to 17.

Free resources 
The Dana Foundation website, dana.org, offers scientist-vetted information about the brain, including PDFs of publications, fact sheets, and lesson plans to download and share, as well as articles, videos, and podcasts targeted to non-scientists.

Web-based publications include reporting from neuroscience events, scientist Q&As, and Brain Basics.

References

External links
Dana Foundation website
The New York Times
Dana Foundation website, Grants
Inside Philanthropy, Dana Foundation Grants
Dana Foundation secondary website, Brain Awareness Week
AAAS website
Dana Foundation website, publications

Biomedical research foundations
Educational foundations in the United States
Medical and health foundations in the United States